Live is the 13th album of Puerto Rican singer Ednita Nazario and her first live album. It was recorded during a sell-out presentation at the Roberto Clemente Coliseum in 1993.

The album was released on March 12, 1994.

Track listing
 "Metamorfosis"
 "No Me Dejes No"
 "Mañana"
 "El Dolor De Tu Presencia"
 "Tú Sin Mi"
 "Medley De Exitos"
"Lo Mejor De Tí"
"La Prohibida"
"Mi Pequeño Amor"
"Contigo Mi Amor"
"Cadenas De Fuego"
"A Que No Le Cuentas"
 "Tres Deseos"
 "Mírame"
 "Mi Corazón Tiene Mente Propia"
 "Tanto Nos Amamos"
 "Lo Que Son Las Cosas"
 "Eres Libre"
 "Un Corazón Hecho Pedazos"
 "Alma De Gitana"
 "Aprenderé"
 "Pensando Siempre En Tí"

Personnel
 Produced by Ednita Nazario

Ednita Nazario live albums
1994 live albums
Spanish-language live albums